Alexandra Golby is a professor of neurosurgery at Harvard Medical School and the Haley Distinguished Chair in the Neurosciences at Brigham and Women’s Hospital. She graduated from Stanford Medical School, where she also did her neurosurgery residency.

Golly research and clinical practice focus on image-guided neurosurgery, particularly  in regards to patients with brain tumors and epilepsy.

Notable publications 
Differential responses in the fusiform region to same-race and other-race faces (2001) 
Material-specific lateralization in the medial temporal lobe and prefrontal cortex during memory encoding (2001) 
Memory lateralization in medial temporal lobe epilepsy assessed by functional MRI (2002) 
Memory encoding in Alzheimer's disease: an fMRI study of explicit and implicit memory (2005) 
Functional brain mapping and its applications to neurosurgery (2007)

References 

Year of birth missing (living people)
Living people
American neurosurgeons
Hotchkiss School alumni
Harvard Medical School faculty
Yale University alumni
Stanford University alumni
Women surgeons